Elections to Liverpool City Council were held on 1 November 1926.

One third of the council seats were up for election. The term of office for each councillor being three years.

Six of the thirty-eight seats up for election were uncontested.

After the election, the composition of the council was:

Election result

Ward results

* - Councillor seeking re-election

Comparisons are made with the 1923 election results.

Abercromby

Aigburth

Allerton

Anfield

Breckfield

Brunswick

Castle Street

Childwall

N.B Lady Helena Agnes Dalrymple Muspratt had crossed the floor from the Liberals to the Conservatives since being elected under the Liberal ticket in 1923.

Dingle

Edge Hill

Everton

Exchange

Fairfield

Fazakerley

Garston

Granby

Great George

Kensington

Kirkdale

Low Hill

Much Woolton

Netherfield

North Scotland

Old Swan

Prince's Park

Sandhills

St. Anne's

St. Domingo

St. Peter's

Sefton Park East

Sefton Park West

South Scotland

Vauxhall

Walton

Warbreck

Wavertree

Wavertree West

West Derby

Aldermanic Elections

Aldermanic Election 9 November 1926

18 Aldermen were elected by the councillors on 9 November 1926 for a term of six years.

 - re-elected aldermen.

Aldermanic Elections 2 March 1927

Because Sir John Sutherland Harmood Banner Bart. D.L. refused the offer of the office of Alderman, Councillor Edward West (Liberal, Warbreck, elected unopposed 1 November 1924) was elected by the councillors as an alderman on 2 March 1927

The term of office to expire on 9 November 1932.

Following the death of Alderman John Lea (Liberal, last elected as an alderman on 9 November 1926 on 26 January 1927, a poll of councillors was held to elect a replacement :

The term of office to expire on 9 November 1932.

Aldermanic Election 5 October 1927

Because Councillor James Sexton CBE MP refused the office of alderman, (to which he was elected by the councillors on 2 March 1927), which was reported to the Council on 6 April 1927

Councillor Luke Hogan (Labour, Brunswick, elected 1 November 1924) was elected as an alderman by a poll of the councillors on 5 October 1927.

The term of office to expire on 9 November 1932.

By-elections

No. 19 Kensington, 14 December 1926

Following the death of Councillor Henry Baxter (Conservative, Kensington, elected 1 November 1924) on 10 November 1926,

No. 26 Warbreck, 22 March 1927

Caused by Councillor Edward West (Liberal, Warbreck, elected unopposed 1 November 1924) being elected by the councillors as an alderman on 2 March 1927 because Sir John Sutherland Harmood Banner Bart. D.L. refused the offer of the office of Alderman.

No. 37 Garston, 17 May 1927

Caused by the death of Councillor Edmund Robert Thompson (Conservative, Garston, elected 1 November 1925) on 22 April 1927.

No. 37 Garston, 23 June 1927

Caused by the death of Councillor George Atkin (Conservative, Garston, elected 1 November 1924) on 24 May 1927.

See also

 Liverpool City Council
 Liverpool Town Council elections 1835 - 1879
 Liverpool City Council elections 1880–present
 Mayors and Lord Mayors of Liverpool 1207 to present
 History of local government in England

References

1926
1926 English local elections
1920s in Liverpool